Launaguet is a commune in the Haute-Garonne department in southwestern France.

Population
The inhabitants of the commune are known as Launaguetois or Launaguetoises in French.

Sights

Twin towns
Launaguet is twinned with:
 Orăștie, Romania

See also
Communes of the Haute-Garonne department

References

Communes of Haute-Garonne